Eupithecia antalica is a moth in the family Geometridae. It is found in Greece and the Near East.

References

Moths described in 2001
antalica
Moths of Europe
Moths of Asia